James Fox  (born 1939) is an English actor.

James or Jim Fox may also refer to:

Arts and entertainment
 Jim Fox (composer) (born 1953), American composer
 Jimmy Fox (born 1947), drummer from the band The James Gang
 James Fox (singer) (born 1976), British singer, pianist, and guitarist
 James Fox (art historian) (born 1982), British art historian and broadcaster
 James Fox (journalist) (born 1945), author of White Mischief

Government and politics
 James Fox (Newfoundland politician) (1817–1883), Canadian politician
 James Augustus Fox (1827–1901), American Alderman and Mayor of Cambridge, Massachusetts
 James Carroll Fox (1928–2019), American federal judge
 James Patrick Fox (1860–1899), Canadian politician
 James Fox (Australian politician) (1886–1951), New South Wales politician
 Jamie Fox (James Patrick Fox, 1954–2017), New Jersey politician and political strategist

Sports
 Jim Fox (ice hockey) (born 1960), former professional ice hockey player
 Jim Fox (basketball, born 1943), former professional basketball player
 Jim Fox (basketball, born 1973), college basketball head coach for Appalachian State University
 Jim Fox (pentathlete) (born 1941), British Olympic modern pentathlete
 James Fox (rower) (born 1992), British Paralympic rower

Other
 James J. Fox (born 1940), American born, Australian resident anthropologist of Indonesia
 Jim Fox (Canadian Army officer), Canadian general
 James Fox (engineer) (1780–1830), British engineer, pioneer machine tool maker
 James Fox (prison reform advocate)
 James Alan Fox, American criminologist, professor at Northeastern University

See also
 Jimmie Foxx (1907–1967), American baseball player
 Jamie Fox (Canadian politician), Canadian politician
 Jamie Fox (fiddler), Native American musician
 Jamie Foxx (born 1967), American actor's stage name